Placer County (Spanish for "sand deposit"), officially the County of Placer, is a county in the U.S. state of California. As of the 2020 census, the population was 404,739. The county seat is Auburn.

Placer County is included in the Greater Sacramento metropolitan area. It is in both the Sacramento Valley and Sierra Nevada regions, in what is known as the Gold Country. The county stretches roughly 65 miles (105 km) from Sacramento's suburbs at Roseville to the Nevada border and the shore of Lake Tahoe.

Etymology
The discovery of gold in 1848 brought tens of thousands of miners from around the world during the California Gold Rush. In addition, many more thousands came to provide goods and services to the miners. On April 25, 1851, the fast-growing county was formed from parts of Sutter and Yuba Counties with Auburn as the county seat. Placer County took its name from the Spanish word for sand or gravel deposits containing gold. Miners washed away the gravel, leaving the heavier gold, in a process known as "placer mining".

History 
Gold mining was a major industry through the 1880s, but gradually the new residents turned to farming the fertile foothill soil, harvesting timber and working for the Southern Pacific Railroad. Auburn was settled when Claude Chana discovered gold in Auburn Ravine in May 1848 and later became a shipping and supply center for the surrounding gold camps. The cornerstone of Placer's courthouse, which is clearly visible from Interstate 80 through Auburn, was laid on July 4, 1894. The building was renovated during the late 1980s and continues to serve the public with courtrooms, a sheriff's office and the Placer County Museum. Roseville, once a small agricultural center, became a major railroad center and grew to the county's most populous city after Southern Pacific Railroad moved its railroad switching yards there in 1908.

Loomis and Newcastle began as mining towns, but soon became centers of a booming fruit-growing industry, supporting many local packing houses. Penryn was founded by a Welsh miner, Griffith Griffith, who established a large granite quarry. Rocklin began as a railroad town and became home to a number of granite quarries. Lincoln and Sheridan continue to support ranching and farming. Lincoln also is the home of one of the county's oldest businesses, the Gladding, McBean terra cotta clay manufacturing plant, established in 1875.

The 1960 Winter Olympics were hosted in Squaw Valley, in Placer County.

Geography 
Watercourses in Placer County include the American River and Bunch Creek. 40.96% of Lake Tahoe's surface area is in Placer County, more than in any of the four other counties in which it lies.

Adjacent counties
 Nevada County - north
 Washoe County, Nevada - northeast
 Carson City, Nevada - east
 Douglas County, Nevada - southeast
 El Dorado County - south
 Sacramento County - southwest
 Sutter County - west
 Yuba County - northwest

National protected areas 
 Eldorado National Forest in part
 Tahoe National Forest in part

Demographics

2020 census

Note: the US Census treats Hispanic/Latino as an ethnic category. This table excludes Latinos from the racial categories and assigns them to a separate category. Hispanics/Latinos can be of any race.

2011

Places by population, race, and income

2010 Census
The 2010 United States Census reported that Placer County had a population of 348,432. The racial makeup of Placer County was 290,977 (83.5%) White, 4,751 (1.4%) African American, 3,011 (0.9%) Native American, 20,435 (5.9%) Asian, 778 (0.2%) Pacific Islander, 13,375 (3.8%) from other races, and 15,105 (4.3%) from two or more races. There were 4,710 Hispanics or Latinos of any race (12.8%).

2000

As of the census of 2000, there were 248,399 people, 93,382 households, and 67,701 families residing in the county. There were 107,302 housing units at an average density of 76 per square mile (30/km2). The racial makeup of the county was 88.6% White, 0.8% Black or African American, 0.9% Native American, 3.0% Asian, 0.2% Pacific Islander, 3.4% from other races, and 3.2% from two or more races. 9.7% of the population were Hispanic or Latino of any race. 15.5% were of German, 12.3% English, 10.6% Irish, 7.1% Italian and 7.0% American ancestry according to Census 2000. 89.7% spoke only English at home; 6.0% spoke Spanish.

There were 93,382 households, out of which 35.3% had children under the age of 18 living with them, 59.4% were married couples living together, 9.2% had a female householder with no husband present, and 27.5% were non-families. 21.3% of all households were made up of individuals, and 8.1% had someone living alone who was 65 years of age or older. The average household size was 2.63 and the average family size was 3.06.

In the county, the population was spread out, with 26.5% under the age of 18, 6.9% from 18 to 24, 29.00% from 25 to 44, 24.5% from 45 to 64, and 13.1% who were 65 years of age or older. The median age was 38 years. For every 100 females, there were 96.4 males. For every 100 females age 18 and over, there were 93.9 males.

The median income for a household in the county was $57,535, and the median income for a family was $65,858 (these figures had risen to $68,463 and $80,987 respectively as of a 2007 estimate). Males had a median income of $50,410 versus $33,763 for females. The per capita income for the county was $27,963. About 3.9% of families and 5.8% of the population were below the poverty line, including 6.3% of those under age 18 and 3.8% of those age 65 or over. Unemployment in the county is just under 7% which is considerably lower than the state's average.

Politics, government, and policing

Government
County government is by a five-person four-year term elected board of supervisors with a board-appointed county manager and his/her department administrators.

Law enforcement
The Placer County Sheriff's Office provides court protection, jail administration, and coroner services for all of Placer County. It provides patrol, detective, and other police services for the unincorporated areas of the county plus by contract to the city of Colfax and the town of Loomis.

Politics

Voter registration

Cities by population and voter registration

Overview 
In its early history Placer County was solidly Republican: it voted Republican in every election between 1860 and 1912, when Bull Moose nominee Theodore Roosevelt was California's official Republican nominee. Between 1916 and 1976, however, the county voted Republican only in three landslide elections of 1920, 1952 and 1972 – in all of which its GOP margins were much smaller than for the state or nation. Since the “Reagan Revolution” Placer County has become and remained a stronghold of the Republican Party; it consistently elects Republican public officials and has voted for presidential candidates from the party in every election since 1980.

Crime 

The following table includes the number of incidents reported and the rate per 1,000 persons for each type of offense.

Cities by population and crime rates

Economy

Top employers

According to the county's 2010 Comprehensive Annual Financial Report, the top employers in the county are:

mPOWER Placer

mPOWER Placer is Placer County's Property Assessed Clean Energy (PACE) program.  It provides financing to commercial, industrial, agricultural and multifamily property owners to install energy efficiency, water conservation and renewable energy retrofits. The program, administered by the Placer County Treasurer-Tax Collector’s Office, was approved by the Board of Supervisors on February 9, 2010, and launched on March 22, 2010, and is open to eligible Placer County property owners.

Transportation

Major highways 

  Interstate 80
  State Route 28
  State Route 49
  State Route 65
  State Route 89
  State Route 174
  State Route 267

Public transportation 

 Placer County Transit provides basic bus service primarily along the I-80 corridor between Alta and the Watt Ave. Sacramento Regional Transit light rail station. PCT also runs commuter service to Downtown Sacramento.
 The cities of Auburn, Lincoln, and Roseville have their own local transit service. The city of Roseville also offers a commuter service to Sacramento.
 Gold Country Stage (Nevada County) provides a connection between Auburn and Grass Valley.
 Tahoe Truckee Area Regional Transit, operated by Placer County and the City of Truckee, operates in Truckee (Nevada County), Tahoe City and along the North Shore of Lake Tahoe to Incline Village, Nevada.
 Greyhound and Amtrak provide long-distance intercity service.

Airports 

There are three general aviation airports in Placer County:

 Lincoln Regional Airport
 Auburn Airport
 Truckee-Tahoe Airport

The closest commercial airport is Sacramento International Airport in Sacramento.

Communities

Cities
 Auburn (county seat)
 Colfax
 Lincoln
 Rocklin
 Roseville

Towns
 Loomis

Census-designated places

 Alta
 Carnelian Bay
 Cedar Flat
 Dollar Point
 Dutch Flat
 Foresthill
 Granite Bay
 Kings Beach
 Kingvale
 Meadow Vista
 Newcastle
 North Auburn
 Penryn
 Sheridan
 Sunnyside-Tahoe City
 Tahoe Vista
 Tahoma

Other communities

 Applegate
 Baxter
 Blue Canyon
 Emigrant Gap
 Northstar
 Ophir
 Olympic Valley
 Weimar

Ghost town
 Iowa Hill

Population ranking
The population ranking of the following table is based on the 2020 census of Placer County.

† county seat

See also 
Hiking trails in Placer County
List of school districts in Placer County, California
National Register of Historic Places listings in Placer County, California

Notes

References

External links 

 
 Placer County Library
 Placer Nature Center
 Placer County Museums
 Placer Sentinel Newspaper
 Special Election called for 4th Assembly District, 1/11/2011
 Placer County Network of Care

 
California counties
Counties in the Sacramento metropolitan area
Sacramento Valley
Sierra Nevada (United States)
1851 establishments in California
Populated places established in 1851